Senik is a small village in the Municipality of Brda in the Littoral region of Slovenia, close to the border with Italy.

The local church, built on a small hill just north of the village, is dedicated to Mary Magdalene and belongs to the Parish of Kožbana.

References

External links
Senik on Geopedia

Populated places in the Municipality of Brda